The Robert L. Noble Prize (not to be confused with the Nobel Prize) is awarded each year by the Canadian Cancer Society to researchers whose contributions have led to a significant advance in cancer research. The prize consists of 2,000 Canadian dollars for the researcher receiving the prize, and an additional 20,000 Canadian dollars to further his/her cancer research.

It honours Robert L. Noble, a Canadian researcher who in the 1950s helped with the discovery of vincristine and vinblastine, widely used anti-cancer drugs.

Recipients
Source: Canadian Cancer Society

See also

 List of biomedical science awards

References

Cancer research awards
Canadian science and technology awards
Awards established in 1994
1994 establishments in Canada